The 1964 Colorado Buffaloes football team represented the University of Colorado as a member of the Big Eight Conference during the 1964 NCAA University Division football season. Led by second-year head coach Eddie Crowder, the Buffaloes were 2–8 overall and 1–6 in conference play, seventh in the Big 8. Colorado played their home games on campus at Folsom Field in Boulder, Colorado.

Schedule

References

External links
 Sports-Reference – 1964 Colorado Buffaloes

Colorado
Colorado Buffaloes football seasons
Colorado Buffaloes football